Clear Skies is a 1961 Soviet romance film directed by Grigori Chukhrai. It won the Grand Prix (in a tie with Kaneto Shindo's The Naked Island) at the 2nd Moscow International Film Festival.

Plot
The film takes place in the USSR during the 1940s and the 1950s. During the war pilot Alexey Astakhov fights, gets captured and then manages to escape. In peacetime Alexey is treated with distrust and suspicion - he is a soldier who had been in captivity and thereby has "stained the moral character of the Soviet pilot." Alexey suffers, can not find work in his field nor a place in life. Sasha Lvova's love which she has carried through the war and the difficulties of the postwar period saves him. After the death of Stalin, Astakhov is called to the Ministry of Defense, where his military award is returned. Alexey returns to the squadron and tests planes.

Cast
 Yevgeni Urbansky as Aleksei Astakhov
 Nina Drobysheva as Sasha Lvova
 Natalya Kuzmina as Lyusya  
 Vitali Konyayev as Petya  
 Georgi Kulikov as Mitya  
 Leonid Knyazev as Ivan Ilyich 
 Georgi Georgiu as Nikolai Avdeyevich  
 Oleg Tabakov as Seryozhka  
 Alik Krylov as Sergey
 Vitali Bondarev as Yegorka

References

External links
 

1961 films
1960s romance films
1960s Russian-language films
Films directed by Grigori Chukhrai
Soviet war films
1961 war films
War romance films
Soviet World War II films
Russian World War II films